"Lover of the Light" is a song performed by British rock band Mumford & Sons, released as the second single from their second studio album Babel (2012). It was released on 5 November 2012 as a digital download. The song was written by Mumford & Sons and produced by Markus Dravs.

Music video
A music video to accompany the release of "Lover of the Light" was first released onto YouTube on 4 November 2012 at a total length of five minutes and fifty-five seconds. It was co-directed by British actor Idris Elba and British screenwriter Dan Cadan. The video does not feature the band, it tells the story of a blind man (Elba) who puts aside his cane and runs free, ending with him at the edge of a cliff. A similar setting is used in the clip Glósóli of the Icelandic post-rock band Sigur Rós, part of their 2005 album Takk....

Track listing

Charts

Weekly charts

Year-end charts

Certifications

Release history

References

2012 singles
Mumford & Sons songs
Island Records singles
Song recordings produced by Markus Dravs
Songs written by Marcus Mumford
Songs written by Ted Dwane
Songs written by Ben Lovett (British musician)
Songs written by Winston Marshall
2012 songs
Folk ballads
2010s ballads